The 1982 James Hardie 1000 was the 23rd running of the Bathurst 1000 touring car race. It was held on 3 October 1982 at the Mount Panorama Circuit just outside Bathurst in New South Wales, Australia. The race, which was Round 3 of both the 1982 Australian Endurance Championship and the 1982 Australian Endurance Championship of Makes, was open to cars eligible to the locally developed CAMS Group C touring car regulations with two engine capacity based classes.

The race was won by Peter Brock and Larry Perkins of the Holden Dealer Team driving a Holden Commodore. It was Brock's sixth victory, a record, the Holden Dealer Team's sixth win and the first win in the race for a car carrying a Racecam unit. Holden Commodores filled the top four positions, but only after Dick Johnson was disqualified after originally finishing in fourth spot. Brock and Perkins finished a lap ahead of Allan Grice and Alan Browne. It was the second time Grice had finished second but had yet to win. The second Holden Dealer Team Commodore of John Harvey and Gary Scott finished third, equalling the best previous performance of the HDT, their first in 1969.

Class structure

Class A
Officially designated as the Over 3000cc class, it featured the V8 Holden Commodores, Ford Falcons and Chevrolet Camaros. Also in this class were the Mazda RX-7s, the factory supported BMW 635CSis and a Jaguar XJS.

Class B
Officially designated as the Under 3000cc class, it featured the turbo charged Nissan Bluebirds, considerably quicker than the opposition made up of Ford Capris, Alfa Romeo GTV6s, and an Audi 5+5 plus cars from the previously featured 2.0 litre class, i.e. Toyota Celicas, Ford Escorts and Isuzu Geminis.

As a round of the Australian Endurance Championship there was also a secondary class structure applied which divided cars into four engine capacity classes.
 Up to 1600cc
 1601 to 2000cc
 2001 to 3000cc
 3001 to 6000cc
There were no starters in the Up to 1600cc class.

Hardies Heroes
In official qualifying, Re-Car team owner and driver Alan Browne put up a $5,000 reward for the first Touring Car driver to break the 100 mph average lap barrier. The favourite to win the money was the Bathurst pole winner of the past two years, Kevin Bartlett in his  V8 Chevrolet Camaro Z28. However, when his co-driver Colin Bond crashed the car due to a tyre blowout, the subsequent repairs put the Camaro's preparation a day behind and its chance was gone.

The Holden Dealer Team had announced Peter Brock to have broken the barrier in qualifying and Browne actually congratulated Brock. However it was revealed that Brock's time of 2:18.1 fell short of 100 mph average. Coincidentally it was Browne's co-driver Allan Grice who pocketed the cash in Friday's qualifying session with a time of 2:17.8 to set the first ever 100 mph lap of the 6.172 km Mount Panorama circuit.

After qualifying 31st and 43rd in 1981, the appearance of the Nissan Bluebird Turbos in the top 10 in qualifying came as a surprise to the V8 fraternity which had dominated the race since 1967, and was a sign of things to come at Bathurst. From 1983, turbo powered cars would qualify first or second in every year other than 1985 until CAMS banned turbos at the end of 1992, with 1983 (Brock in a V8 Holden Commodore VH SS), and 1985 (Tom Walkinshaw's V12 Jaguar XJS) being the only years a turbo powered car did not qualify on pole at Bathurst. The turbos prime year would come in 1989 when all 10 cars in the Saturday morning runoff were turbo powered (nine Fords and one Nissan). Also surprising the V8 runners was four time race winner Allan Moffat who qualified his rotary powered Mazda RX-7 in Hardies Heroes for the second year running.

* The first and only pole position for Allan Grice at Bathurst, and the first of only two times in 26 starts between 1968 and 2002 that he qualified on the front row. He finished 2nd in the 1986 Hardies Heroes, but had been the fastest qualifier going into the runoff.* Masahiro Hasemi became the first and (as of 2020) only Japanese driver to appear in the runoff.* 1982 saw the first time a turbocharged car qualified for the runoff. Hasemi and former Australian Rally Champion George Fury qualified their Nissan Motorsport Bluebird Turbos 3rd and 10th respectively* Nissan became the 5th make of car to appear in Hardies Heroes, following Holden, Ford, Chevrolet and Mazda. The Bluebirds were also the first cars in the runoff to use a 4 cyl engine.* 1976 race winners Bob Morris and John Fitzpatrick were due to start in their Seiko Watches sponsored Ford XE Falcon after Morris finished 6th in the runoff. Unfortunately during Saturday afternoon's final practice session, Fitzpatrick suffered a broken wheel going into Forrest's Elbow and crashed the car heavily into the bank. The damage was sufficient to see the car withdrawn from the race.

Results

References

Statistics
 Provisional Pole Position - #4 Allan Grice - 2:17.8
 Pole Position - #4 Allan Grice - 2:17.501
 Fastest Lap - #05 Peter Brock - 2:20.1 (lap record)
 Average Speed - 154 km/h
 Race Time - 6:32:03.2

External links
 CAMS Manual reference to Australian titles
 www.touringcarracing.net
 race results
 Autopics Bathurst images

Motorsport in Bathurst, New South Wales
James Hardie 1000